Scott Hansen (born February 7, 1977), known professionally as Tycho, is an American musician, record producer, composer, and songwriter based in San Francisco. He is also known as ISO50 for his photographic and design work. His music blends multiple stylistic components, including downtempo guitar, analogue synthesis, and ambient elements such as breathing and found sounds of weather broadcasts and dialogue.

History 
Tycho's first EP, titled The Science of Patterns, was released in 2002. The first Tycho album, Past Is Prologue, was released in 2006. At this time Tycho was a solo project created by Hansen.

Tycho signed to Mom+Pop and Ninja Tune in 2019 but has also released music on Ghostly International, Merck Records and Gammaphone Records. The fourth studio album, Epoch, received a nomination for Best Dance/Electronic Album in the 2017 Grammy Awards.

Tycho received a second Grammy nomination for Best Dance/Electronic Album for his fifth studio album, Weather, in the 2020 Grammy Awards. In February 2020, Tycho released Simulcast, an instrumental version of Weather he previously promised fans.

Sound

Hansen's music project Tycho is influenced by and has been compared to artists such as DJ Shadow, Ulrich Schnauss and Boards of Canada. His music captures the sound of lo-fi analog media while remaining both progressive and futuristic in composition and style. Themes of nostalgia, longing, childhood and the natural world are interspersed throughout Tycho's work. Brief interludes or vignettes also feature in his earlier work. In Past Is Prologue, Hansen includes excerpts from broadcasts accompanied by atmospherics to capture a specific moment or mood. His music is characterized by a mixture of electronic synths, live instrumentation, and vintage sound clips.

Until the release of the album Dive, Hansen worked as a solo artist and used the digital audio workstation, Cakewalk Sonar, to work with analog, virtual analog hardware, digital hardware and VSTI synthesizers as well as samples derived from live instrumentation, played by Hansen himself. While creating the album, he switched over to REAPER, a more dynamic program which he credits with allowing him to finish Dive. The album tour had a live band for the first time, hybridizing the electronic music experience with the dynamic energy of a performance featuring live instrumentation. After touring, Hansen decided to permanently open up the solo project, and work both on tour and in the studio alongside two other band members, Zac Brown on bass guitar and guitar and Rory O'Connor on drums. When performing, all the guitars are live, played either by Hansen or Brown. Bass guitar is also always live, with the exception of the song "Hours". Drums are played live by O'Connor, and lead synthesizers are also live. Hansen often plays guitar while triggering samples with his foot. His goal is to find the balance between the fluid nature of a live show with artists playing physical instruments and the precision and ability to stay true to the album of electronic music.

Band members

Scott Hansen – synthesizers, guitar, bass guitar, visuals, programming
Zac Brown – bass guitar, guitar
Rory O'Connor – drums, percussion
Billy Kim (touring member) – bass guitar, keyboards, synthesizers, visuals
Hannah Cottrell – vocals

Past members
Joe Davancens (touring member) – bass guitar, keyboards, synthesizers, programming

Discography

Studio albums
 Past Is Prologue (2006)
 Dive (2011)
 Awake (2014)
 Epoch (2016)
 Weather (2019)
 Simulcast (2020)

References

External links
Official website
Wired Tours Tycho Studio

1977 births
21st-century American composers
Ambient musicians
American male composers
Record producers from California
Chillwave musicians
Living people
Musicians from Sacramento, California
Downtempo musicians
21st-century American male musicians
Mom + Pop Music artists
Ninja Tune artists